Twarde Pierniki Toruń is a Polish professional basketball team based in Toruń. The team currently plays in the Polish Basketball League (PLK). The club has won Polish Cup and Polish Supercup titles in 2018.

History
Twarde Pierniki was founded in 2004. Toruń was offered a spot in the 2014–15 PLK season as a wild card because of the expansion from 12 to 16 teams. In the 2016–17 season, Toruń had its best season in club history and reached the PLK Finals. Here it lost to Stelmet Zielona Góra which meant the team ended in second place.

Toruń won its first trophy in on 19 February 2018, when it beat  Zielona Góra 88–80 in the final of the Polish Cup, behind Karol Gruszecki who was named Most Valuable Player of the tournament.

Sponsorship names
Due to sponsorship reasons, the club has been known as:
MMKS VIII LO SIDEn Toruń (2004–2005)
SIDEn MMKS VIII LO Toruń (2005–2011)
SIDEn Polski Cukier Toruń (2011–2014)
Polski Cukier Toruń (2014–2021)
Arriva Twarde Pierniki Toruń (from 2023)

Honours
Polish League
Runners-up (2): 2016–17, 2018–19

Polish League
3rd place (1): 2017–18

Polish Cup
Winners (1): 2018

Polish Supercup
Winners (1): 2018

Season by season

Players

Current roster

Coaches 

 Marek Ziółkowski
 Grzegorz Sowiński: 2008–2011, 2013–2014
 Jarosław Zyskowski: 2011–2012
 Eugeniusz Kijewski: 2012–2013
 Milija Bogicević: 2014–2015
 Jacek Winnicki: 2015–2017
 Dejan Mihevc: 2017–2019
 Sebastian Machowski: 2019–2020
 Jaroslaw Zawadka: 2020–2021
 Ivica Skelin: 2021–2022
 Miloš Mitrović: 2022–2023
 Cédric Heitz: 2023–present

Individual awards
 Polish Cup MVP
Karol Gruszecki – 2018

 Polish Supercup MVP
Karol Gruszecki – 2018

PLK Most Improved Player
Krzysztof Sulima – 2017

PLK Best Coach
Dejan Mihevc – 2018

All-1 Liga Team
Tomasz Wojdyła – 2014

All-PLK Team
Danny Gibson – 2016
Maksym Korniyenko – 2016
Aaron Cel – 2018, 2019

Notable players

References

Basketball teams in Poland
Basketball teams established in 2004
Sport in Toruń